This is a list of Canadian films which were released in the 1920s.

References

1920s
Canada
1920s in Canada